Bhopan is a small village in Ratnagiri district, Maharashtra state in Western India. The 2011 Census of India recorded a total of 984 residents in the village. Bhopan's geographical area is .batli bhai area

References

Villages in Ratnagiri district
Batli bhai area